Neotalara is a genus of moths in the subfamily Arctiinae. It contains the single species Neotalara metamelaena, which is found in Ecuador.

References

Natural History Museum Lepidoptera generic names catalog

Lithosiini